The Norwegian Players' Association ( or NISO is a trade union for professional football, handball and ice hockey players in Norway. Established in 1995, it is member of the Norwegian Confederation of Trade Unions.

It was established in 1995, after Morgan Andersen and Rolf Herman Longnes had made preparations for one year.

References

External links
 Official site

Trade unions in Norway
Organisations based in Oslo
Trade unions established in 1995
1995 establishments in Norway
Football in Norway
Ice hockey in Norway
Handball in Norway
Norwegian Confederation of Trade Unions
Association football trade unions